Gilgit-Baltistan Independence Day is celebrated on 1 November every year as independence from Dogra Raj in 1947. Every 1 November is a holiday in Gilgit-Baltistan, the flag hoisting ceremony is attended by the Governor, Chief Minister, Force Commander Northern Areas along with civil and military officials and war veterans of GB.

In 2020 during the GB independence day celebration event in Gilgit, former Prime minister of Pakistan Imran Khan announced the Provincial Province status for Gilgit-Baltistan.

History
On this day in 1947, Brigadier Ghansara Singh, the governor appointed in Gilgit by Maharaja Hari Singh of the state of Jammu and Kashmir, was arrested by the local force of Gilgit Scouts under Major William Brown through a military coup and with that, freedom was secured in Gilgit. An independent state was established here in the name of the Republic of Gilgit of which Raja Shah Rais Khan was appointed as the president and Captain Mirza Hassan Khan as the military chief. Fifteen days later, the people of Gilgit announced their accession to Pakistan on the basis of Islamic relations, and in this regard, the heads of both the states of Hunza and Nagar signed formal documents of accession with the founder of Pakistan, Muhammad Ali Jinnah. By signing, he also confirmed the public's sentiments and wishes.

See also
 Azad Kashmir Day

References

Public holidays in Pakistan
Culture of Gilgit-Baltistan
November observances